Thomasville is a census-designated place in northern Oregon County, Missouri, United States. It is located nine miles northwest of Alton on Route 99.

Demographics

History
Thomasville was platted in 1846.  The community was named for George Thomas, a pioneer settler. A post office called Thomasville was established in 1846, and remained in operation until 1979.

Education
Thomasville has a public library, the Thomasville Branch library.

References

Unincorporated communities in Oregon County, Missouri
Unincorporated communities in Missouri